The ninth season of JAG premiered on CBS on September 26, 2003, and concluded on May 21, 2004. The season, starring David James Elliott and Catherine Bell, was produced by Belisarius Productions in association with Paramount Television.

Season 9 of JAG aired alongside the first season of NCIS.

Plot 
Commander Harmon "Harm" Rabb, Jr. (David James Elliott) and Lieutenant Colonel Sarah "Mac" MacKenzie (Catherine Bell) are lawyers assigned to the Headquarters of the Judge Advocate General, the internal law firm of the Department of the Navy. Mac, a seasoned Marine and JAG's Chief of Staff, is a lawyer-by-trade, while Harm, a former Tomcat pilot, turned to law following a crash at sea. Together, they investigate numerous cases, including espionage ("A Tangled Webb"), a death in combat ("The One That Got Away"), an Islamic conversion at sea ("Touchdown"), the death of an Iraqi prisoner ("The Boast"), and a Quaker who feels the Navy contradicts his fundamental religious beliefs ("Posse Comitatus"). Also this season, Harm departs JAG ("Shifting Sands") and is recruited by the CIA ("Secret Agent Man"), Commander Carolyn Imes (Dana Sparks) reveals she has faked her legal credentials ("Back in the Saddle"), the Secretary of the Navy (Dean Stockwell) is held accountable for deaths of foreign soil ("People v. SecNav"), the team reflect on what could have been ("What If?"), Mac must track down seized heroin ("Trojan Horse"), and Harriet Sims (Karri Turner) is given a commendation. Also, Bud Roberts (Patrick Labyorteaux) is promoted to Lieutenant Commander, the Admiral Chegwidden (John M. Jackson) retires, and Harm and Mac consider their future ("Hail and Farewell").

Production 
During season nine, actor John M. Jackson "decided to 'retire' from his long-running role on the series". The character of A.J. Chegwidden retired during the season finale, and was replaced the next season by David Andrews as Major General Gordon Cresswell.

Cast and characters

Main 
 David James Elliott as Harmon Rabb, Jr., Commander
 Catherine Bell as Sarah MacKenzie, Lieutenant Colonel in the Marine Corps.
 Patrick Labyorteaux as Bud Roberts, Lieutenant
 John M. Jackson as A. J. Chegwidden, Rear Admiral

Also starring 
 Karri Turner as  Harriet Sims, Lieutenant
 Randy Vasquez as Victor Galindez, Gunnery Sergeant in the Marine Corps.
 Zoe McLellan as Jennifer Coates, Petty Officer
 Scott Lawrence as Sturgis Turner, Commander

Recurring 
 Andrea Thompson as Alison Krennick, Rear Admiral
 Steven Culp as Clayton Webb, CIA Agent
 Chuck Carrington as Jason Tiner, Petty Officer
 Harrison Page as Stiles Morris, Rear Admiral
 Claudette Nevins as Porter Webb, NSA Agent
 Michael Bellisario as Midshipman Michael Roberts, Midshipman
 Dana Sparks as Carolyn Imes, Commander
 Dean Stockwell as Edward Sheffield, Secretary of the Navy
 Jameson Parker as Harrison Kershaw, CIA Director
 Laura Putney as Catherine Gale, CIA Attorney
 Hallee Hirsh as Mattie Johnson
 Isabella Hofmann as Meredith Cavanaugh

Episodes

See also
 2003–2004 United States network television schedule

Notes

References

External links 
 Season 9 on IMDb
 Season 9 on TV.com
 Season 9 on TV Guide

09
2003 American television seasons
2004 American television seasons